Hannes Drews (born 27 March 1982) is a German football manager who works as assistant manager at Werder Bremen.

Career
In January 2022, Drews became assistant manager to Ole Werner at Werder Bremen.

References

External links
 
 

1982 births
Living people
People from Neumünster
German football managers
2. Bundesliga managers
FC Erzgebirge Aue managers